The 1936 Washington gubernatorial election was held on November 3, 1936. Incumbent Democrat Clarence D. Martin defeated Republican nominee Roland H. Hartley with 69.36% of the vote.

Primary elections
Primary elections were held on September 8, 1936.

Candidates 
Clarence D. Martin, incumbent Governor
Roland H. Hartley, former Governor
John C. Stevenson, radio announcer and candidate for U.S. Senate in 1934
Otto A. Case, Washington State Treasurer
Walter F. Meier
H. G. Stevenson
Ralph Horr, former U.S. Representative
A. E. Judd
Eugene J. A. Lord	
John Calvin Richards
Erle J. Barnes
Frank W. Harris
Roscoe A. Seeds
James W. Bryan

Results

General election

Candidates
Major party candidates
Clarence D. Martin, Democratic
Roland H. Hartley, Republican 

Other candidates
Ove M. Nelson, Union
John F. McKay, Socialist
William Morley Bouck, Farmer–Labor 
Malcolm M. Moore, Christian
Harold P. Brockway, Communist
Eugene V. Solie, Socialist Labor

Results

References

1936
Washington
Gubernatorial